Philip Childs Keenan (March 31, 1908 – April 20, 2000) was an American astronomer.

Keenan was an American spectroscopist who collaborated with William Wilson Morgan and Edith Kellman (1911–2007) to develop the MKK stellar spectral classification system between 1939 and 1943. This two-dimensional classification system (temperature & luminosity) was further revised by Morgan and Keenan in 1973.  The MK system remains the standard stellar spectral classification system used by astronomers today.

During their long collaboration, Keenan tended to focus his research on stars cooler than the Sun, while Morgan emphasized the hotter stars.  Keenan had a long and productive career, publishing his final scientific paper in 1999, seventy years after his first.

Honors
Named after him
Asteroid 10030 Philkeenan

References
Mary Woods Scott, "Philip Childs Keenan", in Hockey et al. eds., Biographical Encyclopedia of Astronomers (Springer 2007)

External links
 
 Annual Review of Astronomy and Astrophysics 11:29-50, September 1973
 PASP 112:1519–1522, November 2000
 BAAS 33: 1574-1575, 2001

1908 births
2000 deaths
American astronomers